Mount Marion is a hamlet in the Town of Saugerties, Ulster County, New York, United States. Mount Marion has a post office with ZIP code 12456.

References

Hamlets in Ulster County, New York
Hamlets in New York (state)